St. Andrew Lions FC is  a Barbadian football club based in Belleplaine, Saint Andrew. As of 2019 it competes in the Barbados Premier League, the highest level of football in the nation.

Domestic history
Key

References

External links
Barbados FA profile
Global Sports Archive profile
Soccerway profile
National Football Teams profile

Football clubs in Barbados